
Gmina Olszanica is a rural gmina (administrative district) in Lesko County, Subcarpathian Voivodeship, in south-eastern Poland.

The gmina contains part of the protected area called Słonne Mountains Landscape Park.

Villages
Gmina Olszanica contains the villages and settlements of Olszanica, Orelec, Paszowa, Rudenka, Stefkowa, Uherce Mineralne, Wańkowa and Zwierzyń.

Neighbouring gminas
Gmina Olszanica is bordered by the gminas of Bircza, Lesko, Solina, Tyrawa Wołoska and Ustrzyki Dolne.

References
Polish official population figures 2006

Olszanica
Lesko County